Eschach is a river of Baden-Württemberg and of Bavaria, Germany. It is a right headwater of the Aitrach near Leutkirch im Allgäu.

See also
List of rivers of Baden-Württemberg

References

Rivers of Baden-Württemberg
Rivers of Bavaria
Oberallgäu
Ravensburg (district)
Rivers of Germany